F. J. Turner High School is a high school located in the Town of Beloit in Rock County, Wisconsin, and is part of the Beloit Turner School District. The school was named after frontiersman Frederick Jackson Turner. It has 470 students in grades 9 through 12. The school's athletic teams compete in the Wisconsin Interscholastic Athletic Association. The mascot is the Turner Trojan.
Their rivals include the Clinton Cougars and the Jefferson Eagles.

Athletics
Turner won a state championship in boys cross country in 1976.
Turner won a state championship in football in 1988. Turner won a State Championship in Boys Track in 1987.

External links

References

Public high schools in Wisconsin
Schools in Rock County, Wisconsin